Grabovac is a village in the municipality of Svilajnac, Serbia. According to the 2002 census, the village has a population of 1012 people. Name of the village derives from the grab forest (lat. Carpinus betulus) that once stood in its spot. The birth house of Stevan Sindjelic is located in the center of the village and it is open to the public.

References

Populated places in Pomoravlje District